William McCartan Joseph Mooney (5 October 1890 – 11 September 1967) was an Irish first-class cricketer.

Born at Blanchardstown, Mooney received his education in England at Beaumont College, before going up to Brasenose College, Oxford. At Oxford, Mooney was a member of several university societies, such as the University Athletics Club. Playing his club cricket back in Ireland for Phoenix, Mooney first played for the Gentlemen of Ireland on their 1909 tour of North America, playing minor matches against Ottawa, All New York, Baltimore, and Philadelphia Colts. He made his debut in first-class cricket on the tour, playing two first-class matches against the Gentlemen of Philadelphia at Haverford and Philadelphia. He later played a first-class match for Ireland against Scotland at Dublin in 1912. Playing as a specialist batsman in his three first-class matches, he scored just 25 runs from six innings, with a highest score of 23 not out. He served in the British Army during World War I, serving with the Duke of Cornwall's Light Infantry, where he reached the rank of captain. He died at Dublin in September 1967.

References

External links

1890 births
1967 deaths
Sportspeople from Fingal
People educated at Beaumont College
Alumni of Brasenose College, Oxford
Irish cricketers
Gentlemen of Ireland cricketers
British Army personnel of World War I
Duke of Cornwall's Light Infantry officers
Military personnel from Dublin (city)